Rogério Vaz Afonso Fernandes (born 28 August 2002) is a Portuguese professional footballer who plays as a right-back for Casa Pia.

Professional career
Fernandes is a youth product of Arrentela, before moving to Casa Pia's youth academy in 2018. On 20 May 2021, he signed his first professional contract with Casa Pia. On 31 January 2021, he was loaned to Praiense in the Portuguese third division. He returned to Casa Pia for the 2022-23 season, as they were newly promoted to the Primeira Liga.

Personal life
Fernandes' twin brother, Ricardo, is also a professional footballer. Born in Portugal, Fernandes is of Santomean descent.

References

External links
 

2002 births
Living people
People from Seixal
Portuguese footballers
Portuguese people of São Tomé and Príncipe descent
Association football fullbacks
Casa Pia A.C. players
S.C. Praiense players
Liga Portugal 2 players
Campeonato de Portugal (league) players
Twin sportspeople